Sernancelhe ( or ) is a municipality in the district Viseu, Portugal. The population in 2011 was 5671, in an area of 228.61 km2.

The present mayor is Carlos Silva Santiago, elected by the Social Democratic Party. The municipal holiday is May 3.

Parishes
The municipality is composed of 13 parishes:

 Arnas
 Carregal
 Chosendo
 Cunha
 Faia
 Ferreirim e Macieira
 Fonte Arcada e Escurquela
 Granjal
 Lamosa
 Penso e Freixinho
 Quintela
 Sernancelhe e Sarzeda
 Vila da Ponte

Notable people 
 João Rodrigues Tçuzu (1561/2 – 1633/4) soldier, interpreter and priest; known for his early linguistic works on Japanese; introducing western science and culture to Korea 
 Francisco de Soveral (ca.1565 – 1642) a Portuguese prelate; 9th Bishop of São Tomè and the 5th Bishop of Angola and Congo, 1627 to 1642.
 Aquilino Ribeiro (1885–1963) a writer and diplomat; nominated for the Nobel Prize for Literature in 1960 for his novels

References

External links

Municipality official website
Photos from Sernancelhe

Populated places in Viseu District
Municipalities of Viseu District
People from Sernancelhe